Kwakilosa is an administrative ward in the Iringa Urban district of the Iringa Region of Tanzania. In 2016 the Tanzania National Bureau of Statistics report there were 8,317 people in the ward, from 7,948 in 2012.

Neighborhoods 
The ward has 10 neighborhoods.

 Beira
 Frelimo 'C'
 Jangwani
 Kidunda
 Kijiweni
 Kisiwani
 Muungano 'A'
 Muungano 'B'
 Samora
 Shule

References 

Wards of Iringa Region